Jewel Amoah is a Feminist and Human Rights scholar, best known for her work as a human rights advocate and activist in Canada and Africa, who is Assistant Dean, Equity, Diversity and Inclusion at the Daniels Faculty of the University of Toronto. She was previously a part of the Faculty of Law at St. Augustine Campus of the University of the West Indies. Through her work as an attorney and academic, Dr. Amoah has focused on equality rights for women and children, intersectionality, and international human rights. For two decades, Dr. Amoah has facilitated organizational change with regard to harassment, discrimination, workplace equity and human rights. Research interests include Feminist Legal Theory, Critical Race Theory and Legal Pluralism. Developed by Dr. Amoah, GRACE is an analytical tool demonstrating how the intersection of gender, race, age and culture impact access to equality rights for girls subject to customary law in South Africa.

Career 
Originally trained as a lawyer, Amoah has worked with organizations like the United Nations Mission in Sierra Leone, the Centre for Human Rights and Rehabilitation in Malawi, and the Centre for Applied Social Sciences in Namibia. Amoah promotes human rights, gender and racial equality, legislative reform.

Throughout her career, Amoah has published many articles analyzing Black Feminist Theory, racism and sexism in Pornography, and international human rights. 
She also created the GRACE system in "The World On Her Shoulders: The Rights of the Girl-Child in the Context of Culture & Identity", in order to analyze identity and cultural context based on Gender, Race, Age and Culture which has an effect on one's Experience. She proposes the solution to marginalization is to use the GRACE system to analyze intersectionality, and encourage acknowledgement of social identity.

Another one of her developments within the feminist research field is her perspective on Black Feminist Theory. In "“Building Sandcastles in the Snow: Meanings and Misconceptions of the Development of Black Feminist Theory in Canada", Amoah analyzes Black Feminist Theory using the metaphor of sandcastles and snow. Additionally, in both “Religion vs. Culture: Striking the Right Balance in the Context of Traditional African Religions in the New South Africa” and "The Freedoms of Religion and Culture under the South African Constitution: Do Traditional African Religions Enjoy Equal Treatment?", Amoah identifies the ideas intersectionality regarding religion and culture with regard to law.

Amoah has served as in the role of Human Rights & Equity Advisor for the Halton District School Board since January 2020.

In 2022, Amoah was appointed as Assistant Dean, Equity, Diversity and Inclusion at the John H. Daniels Faculty of Architecture, Landscape and Design of the University of Toronto.

Education 
Amoah has a B.A. from McMaster University, a Common Law Degree (LL.B.) from Ottawa University, and LL.M. and Ph.D. from University of Cape Town. Her disseration was titled “Constructing Equality: Developing An Intersectionality Analysis To Achieve Equality For The Girl Child Subject To South African Customary Law”.

Works
"Watch GRACE Grow: African Customary Law and Constitutional Law in the Garden of Equality", in Feminist Constitutionalism: Global Perspectives, Baines et al. eds. (New York: Cambridge University Press, 2012) at 357-376.

"Religion vs. Culture: Striking the Right Balance in the Context of Traditional African Religions in the New South Africa", in Traditional African Religions in South African Law, TW Bennett, ed. (Cape Town: UCT Press, 2011) at pp. 37–62.

"The Freedoms of Religion and Culture under the South African Constitution: Do Traditional African Religions Enjoy Equal Treatment?" (co-authored with Tom Bennett) (2008-2009) 24 Journal of Law and Religion pp. 1–20; also at: (2008) 8 African Human Rights Law Journal 357-375.

"At the Crossroads of Equality: The Convention on the Rights of the Child and the Intersecting Identities of GRACE, An African Girl Child", in Proceedings of the Conference on the International Rights of the Child, Collins et al., eds. (Montreal: Wilson & Lafleur, 2008) at pp. 313–337.

"Building Sandcastles in the Snow: Meanings and Misconceptions of the Development of Black Feminist Theory in Canada" in Theorizing Empowerment: Canadian Perspectives on Black Feminist Thought, Notisha Massaquoi and Njoki Wane, eds., (Toronto: Inanna Press, 2007) at pp. 95–118.

"The World on Her Shoulders: The Rights of The Girl-Child in the Context of Culture and Identity" (2007) 4 Essex Human Rights Review 1. Mendes, Errol. Racial Discrimination Law and Practice, (Carswell: Toronto, 1999 – Release 1 Updates)

"Back on the Auction Block: A Discussion of Black Women and Pornography" (1997) 14 National Black Law Journal 204.

"Narrative: The Road to Black Feminist Theory", (1997) 12 Berkeley Women's Law Journal 84.

See also
 Feminist views on pornography
 Black feminism

References

External links
Profile at University of Toronto

Living people
American feminists
Year of birth missing (living people)